Kundar may refer to:

Kundar River
Flag of Afghanistan
Kundar, alternate spelling of Kondor, Lorestan
Kundar, alternate spelling of Kondor, Qazvin
Kundar, alternate spelling of Kondor, Razavi Khorasan
Kundar, alternate spelling of Kondor, Birjand, South Khorasan
Kundar, alternate spelling of Kondor, Nehbandan, South Khorasan